Bromsgrove International School Thailand (BIST;) is a British curriculum day and boarding school with two campuses in Min Buri District, Bangkok, Thailand, catering for students between the ages of 2 and 18. The school is located within the grounds of a 36-hole golf course within 15 kilometres (9 mi) of Bangkok International Airport (Suvannabhumi) and 30 kilometres (19 mi) from central Bangkok. It provides an alternative for students in Southeast Asia to study in a UK boarding school closer to home.

The school has two campuses which cater for students from Early Years to Year 13 (3–18 years old) including IGCSE and since 2008, A levels. It is affiliated with Bromsgrove School in England, founded in 1553.

Affiliations
The school is operated by a private company, Windsor Education Co Ltd.

It operates under a license granted by Bromsgrove School in Bromsgrove, near Birmingham, England, in 2004. Close ties exist between the two schools with scholarships for Thailand students to study in the UK, a Bromsgrove UK presence on the Board of Governors and staff and management visits between campuses.

Bromsgrove gained accreditation as an examination centre by CIE in 2007.

In May 2008, Bromsgrove affiliated with Daewon Foreign Language High School in Seoul, South Korea. A substantial number of students from Daewon board and study at Bromsgrove for a part of their secondary school career, following a combination the British and Korean curricula. Daewon is a selective school in Korea ranked by The Wall Street Journal as one of the top schools in the world with a high success rate for entry to Ivy League universities.

Bromsgrove achieved accreditation by the Council for International Schools (CIS) in 2011. The school has been a member of the International Schools Association of Thailand (ISAT) since 2003, and competes in the Bangkok International School Athletic Conference (BISAC).

Houses
The house system was introduced in 2005 with the opening of the Windsor Park Campus. There are three houses at Bromsgrove, named after previous headmasters at Bromsgrove School UK:
 Edwards House – named after Mr Chris Edwards MA, Merton College, Oxford (Headmaster 2004-2014).
 Taylor House – named after Mr Tim Taylor, St Peter's College, Oxford (Headmaster 1986-2004)
 Walters House – named after Mr David Walters, Brasenose College, Oxford (Headmaster 1931-1953).

Students in each house compete in a number of sporting and other activities throughout the school year, and are awarded individual House Points for good work and performance. House Trophies are awarded on an annual basis at the Annual Awards Ceremony.

The Student Council, guided by the head boy and head girl, discusses matters of student concern with senior management on a regular basis.

Golf
Bromsgrove is the home for junior golf in Thailand. Its location in a 36-hole golf course allows it to include golf in its curriculum. All students from seven years old are provided with an opportunity to learn golf. Many of the school's junior golfers excel in junior world championships and tournaments around the region. A win for one of the junior golfers include a gold medal in the recent Southeast Asian Games in December 2007.

Campus
Both the Early Years and preparatory-secondary campuses offer academic, sporting and extra curriculum facilities.

The Early Years Campus is situated close to a growing suburban community. The Preparatory and Secondary School is located on the edge of the city in a golf course setting with views of the local countryside.

Publications
Bromsgrove publishes a newsletter, The Bromsgrovian, which is distributed to parents and available on the school website and highlights student achievement and reports on school events.

A yearbook is published annually condensing the previous year’s events, including academic and sporting achievements and residential and day trips.

References

External links

Bromsgrove International School Thailand website
Bromsgrove School (UK) website
Daewon Foreign Language High School website

Educational institutions established in 2002
Bromsgrove
2002 establishments in Thailand
International schools in Bangkok
British international schools in Thailand
Boarding schools in Thailand
Private schools in Thailand
Cambridge schools in Thailand